Manuel of Portugal  may refer to:

Kings

 Manuel I of Portugal (1469–1521), King of Portugal from 1495 to 1521
 Manuel II of Portugal (1889–1932), last King of Portugal from 1908 to 1910

Pretenders
 Manuel, Hereditary Prince of Portugal ( - 1638), son of pretender António, Prior of Crato

Infantes
 Manuel, Prince of Portugal (1531–1537), son of John III of Portugal
 João Manuel, Prince of Portugal (1537–1554), son of John III of Portugal
 Infante Manuel, Count of Ourém (1697–1766), son of Peter II of Portugal

Other
 Manuel de Portugal (poet), (1516–1606), Portuguese writer, poet and diplomat

hu:Mihály portugál királyi herceg (egyértelműsítő lap)